The Château de Pommier  is a château in Saint-Front-la-Rivière, Dordogne, Nouvelle-Aquitaine, France.

Châteaux in Dordogne
Monuments historiques of Dordogne